Yohanes Makanuay (born January 14, 1984) is an Indonesian footballer who currently plays for Persidafon Dafonsoro in the Indonesia Super League.

Club statistics

References

External links

1984 births
Association football forwards
Living people
Indonesian footballers
Liga 1 (Indonesia) players
Persidafon Dafonsoro players
Indonesian Premier Division players